Brasilionata is a genus of Brazilian spiders first described by Wunderlich in 1995. It is represented by a single species, B. arborense. The defining characteristics of this genus include a homogeneous color pattern on the back of the abdomen, setae on the cymbial fold the same size as other setae, a space between the anterior median eyes, and a pointed switch on the end of the palpal bulb similar to that of Microdipoena. Only two specimens have been identified, one in 1995 and another in 2015.

References

Spiders of Brazil
Mysmenidae
Monotypic Araneomorphae genera